Songs in a Mellow Mood is a 1954 studio album by Ella Fitzgerald, accompanied by the pianist Ellis Larkins. The complete album was re-issued as part of the 1994 MCA Records CD, Pure Ella.

Track listing
Side one
"I'm Glad There Is You" (Jimmy Dorsey, Paul Mertz) – 3:10
"What Is There to Say?" (Vernon Duke, Yip Harburg) – 3:22
"People Will Say We're in Love" (Oscar Hammerstein II, Richard Rodgers) – 3:12
"Please Be Kind" (Sammy Cahn, Saul Chaplin) – 3:36
"Until the Real Thing Comes Along" (Cahn, Chaplin, Alberta Nichols, Mann Holiner, L.E. Freeman) – 2:58
"Makin' Whoopee" (Walter Donaldson, Gus Kahn) – 3:07
Side two 
"Imagination" (Johnny Burke, Jimmy Van Heusen) – 2:38
"Stardust" (Hoagy Carmichael, Mitchell Parish) – 4:03
"My Heart Belongs to Daddy" (Cole Porter) – 2:39
"You Leave Me Breathless" (Ralph Freed, Frederick Hollander) – 3:07
"Baby, What Else Can I Do?" (Gerald Marks, Walter Hirsch) – 3:50
"Nice Work If You Can Get It" (George Gershwin, Ira Gershwin) – 2:38

Personnel
 Ella Fitzgerald - vocals
 Ellis Larkins - piano

References

1954 albums
Ella Fitzgerald albums
Albums produced by Milt Gabler
Decca Records albums